Sin código was an Argentine telenovela that aired from 2004 to 2006 on the El Trece television network. It was produced by Pol-Ka, and the main actors were Adrián Suar, Nancy Dupláa, and Nicolás Cabré. It was nominated in several categories for the Martín Fierro Awards in 2004, 2005, and 2006, and won three times in 2005.

Plot
Gabriel Nielsen (Suar) and Oso (Antonio Grimau) have a private security company known as Nielsen Security. Axel (Cabré), the son of Oso, wants to join it but he is rejected. When Oso is murdered, Gabriel and Axel join forces to capture the criminal. In the second season, most employees resign, and policewoman Antonia López (Dupláa) joins the agency.

Awards
Sin código received two nominations for the 2004 Martín Fierro Awards, as best miniseries and best actor in a miniseries (Cabré). It did not win the award in either category. At the 2005 ceremony for the same awards, the program received several nominations. Rita Cortese, nominated alongside Griselda Siciliani, won the Martín Fierro for secondary actress in comedy; Siciliani won the Martín Fierro for new actress. Favio Posca, Nicolás Scarpino and Alfredo Casero were nominated as best secondary actors in a comedy series; Scarpino won the award. Other unsuccessful nominations were best comedy, lead actor in a comedy series (Suar) and lead actress in a comedy series (Dupláa). It received two nominations in 2006, for lead actress in a comedy series (Dupláa) and supporting actor in a comedy series (Scarpino), but did not win either award.

In other media
Sin código had a spin-off, the 2011 superhero live action television series Los únicos, in which Cabré reprised his role as Axel. In the first episodes Cabré had telephone discussions with Gabriel Nielsen; Suar (who is also the head of Pol-Ka, the producers of the program) reprised his character in April. Siciliani worked on Los únicos as well, but with a new character. She made a cameo with her former character, while still working with her current one.

Suar had plans to make a film out of the series. The first testings would be made in January 2006, and the filming would begin on February. However, when he returned from his vacation in January, he cancelled the project. This angered Cabré and Dupláa, who had rejected other plans for that year to take part in the film. Dupláa stayed for some months in Spain with her husband, and Cabré moved to rival channel Telefe. Suar temporarily gave up acting and focused on his work as producer.

Cast
 Adrián Suar as Gabriel Nielsen
 Nicolás Cabré as Axel
 Antonio Grimau as Oso
 Karina Mazzocco as Noelia
 Jessica Bacher as Ana
 Walter Quiroz as Santiago Nielsen
 Marcelo Mazzarello as Zeta
 Nancy Dupláa as Antonia López
 Rita Cortese as Mirna
 Alfredo Casero as Rolo Wasserman
 Marcela Kloosterboer as Virginia
 Nicolás Scarpino as Ernesto
 Griselda Siciliani as Flor
 Favio Posca as Juan
 Matías Santoiani as Prócer
 Mónica Antonopulos as Carla
 Guadalupe Belén Sosa as Anita
 Gisela Van Lacke as Sofía
 Virginia Da Cunha as Luz
 Pablo Cedrón as Carlos Toledo

References

External links
 Official site 
 

2004 telenovelas
2005 telenovelas
2006 telenovelas
Argentine police procedural television series
Pol-ka telenovelas
2004 Argentine television series debuts
2006 Argentine television series endings
Spanish-language telenovelas